Robin Bormuth (born 19 September 1995) is a German professional footballer who plays as a centre-back for  club Kaiserslautern on loan from SC Paderborn.

Career
On 3 August 2020, after seven years with Fortuna Düsseldorf, Bormuth joined 2. Bundesliga side Karlsruher SC on a free transfer. He signed a two-year deal.

On 19 April 2022, Bormuth signed a two-year contract with SC Paderborn, effective 1 July 2022. After playing one DFB-Pokal game for Paderborn and remaining on the bench in the first five league games of the season, on 22 August 2022 he moved on loan to Kaiserslautern.

References

External links
 
 

1995 births
Living people
People from Bergstraße (district)
Sportspeople from Darmstadt (region)
German footballers
Footballers from Hesse
Association football defenders
Fortuna Düsseldorf players
Fortuna Düsseldorf II players
Karlsruher SC players
SC Paderborn 07 players
1. FC Kaiserslautern players
2. Bundesliga players
Bundesliga players
Regionalliga players